(July 9, 1942 – April 14, 1996), born , was a sumo wrestler from Otaru, Hokkaidō, Japan. His highest rank was sekiwake. After his retirement he became an elder of the Japan Sumo Association and the head coach of Onaruto stable.

Career

He made his professional debut in March 1957, joining Asahiyama stable. He won the yūshō or tournament championship with a 13-2 record in the jūryō division in July 1963 and was promoted to the top makuuchi division in the following tournament in September 1963. He was demoted back to jūryō after only two tournaments and changed his shikona to Futasegawa, which had been the fighting name of his stablemaster. He won promotion back to makuuchi in July 1964 but was demoted again, this time after three tournaments. After switching back to the Kotetsuyama name he won promotion to makuuchi for the third time in May 1965 after a 12-3 jūryō runner-up performance, and this time stayed in the top division. He was runner-up to Taihō in March 1966, and won his first sanshō, for Fighting Spirit. In November 1966 he was runner-up for the second time, defeated yokozuna Sadanoyama to earn his first kinboshi, and received the Technique Prize. In the following tournament in January 1967 he was ranked at sekiwake, but scored only 3–12 and never reached the rank again. He is one of the rare examples of a wrestler whose only tournament in the sanyaku ranks was at sekiwake, rather than komusubi (along with Hayateumi and Hokutoriki). He earned a second kinboshi in July 1969 for beating Taihō, and remained a rank-and-file maegashira until March 1971, when a poor 1–14 record saw him demoted back to jūryō. He managed to return to makuuchi in November 1971 but was demoted to jūryō a number of times after that, his last makuuchi appearance coming in January 1974.

Retirement from sumo

He retired in January 1975. He branched out from Asahiyama stable and established the Onaruto stable in October 1975. He produced the top division wrestler Itai, a pusher-thruster like himself who also briefly used the Kōtetsuyama shikona, and the lightweight jūryō wrestler Ishinriki. He was married to a ballet instructor. Onaruto stable closed in December 1994 and he left the Japan Sumo Association.

Death
He died in somewhat mysterious circumstances in 1996, a month before claims he made about match-fixing in sumo were published in a book called Yaocho. The co-writer of the book died within hours of Onaruto, in the same hospital. Police found no evidence of foul play, but Onaruto's wrestler Itai later said his boss had links to a major yakuza crime syndicate.

Fighting style
Kotetsuyama was short for a sumo wrestler at 175cm, but was known for the power of his pushing attack. He was very much an oshi-sumo specialist, who preferred pushing and thrusting at his opponents to fighting on the mawashi or belt. His most common winning kimarite or techniques at sekitori level were oshi-dashi (push out), tsuki-otoshi (thrust over) and hataki-komi (slap down).

Career record
The Nagoya tournament was first held in 1958.

See also
Glossary of sumo terms
List of past sumo wrestlers
List of sumo tournament top division runners-up
List of sumo tournament second division champions
List of sekiwake

References

1942 births
Japanese sumo wrestlers
Sumo people from Hokkaido
Sekiwake
1996 deaths
People from Otaru